Cornea plana may refer to:

Cornea plana 1, an eye condition
Cornea plana 2, an eye condition